Walter Isidor Siegmeister (October 5 or 6, 1903 – September 10, 1965), later known as Raymond W. Bernard, was an early 20th-century American alternative health advocate and esoteric writer, who formed part of the alternative reality subculture. He is credited with the merger of the Hollow Earth theory and religious beliefs about UFOs.

Biography

Siegmeister was born into a family of Russian Jews in Manhattan, New York City. His parents were William Siegmeister and Rebecca "Bessie" Gitler (Gittler), who were both born in Russia. Walter's father William emigrated to the United States in July 1893, and he became a naturalized citizen in the Superior Court, New York County (Manhattan) on October 29, 1902. Walter's father was a surgeon who started out as a student of biochemistry in Germany. Walter had a brother named Elie Siegmeister who was a famous American composer. Walter graduated from Columbia University in 1924, and received his Masters (1930) and Ph.D (1932) degrees in education from New York University. His Ph.D thesis was titled Theory and Practice of Dr. Rudolf Steiner's Pedagogy (New York University, School of Education, 1932). Under the name Bernard, Walter later settled in Florida. Siegmeister died of pneumonia in 1965.

Alternative health

Siegmeister was a natural hygiene and raw food advocate. He authored many books on dieting and nutrition such as Meat-Eating: A Cause of Disease (1956), Super Health Thru Organic Super Food (1958) and Health Through Scientific Nutrition (1960). He was alleged to have practiced breatharianism and a fruitarian diet. However, it was noted by H. Jay Dinshah that he was actually living as a vegan.

Hollow earth

Siegmeister was a proponent of the hollow earth concept and UFOs. His ideas were never taken seriously by academics and have been dismissed as pseudoscience.

Siegmeister wrote of his search for the safest place on Earth from radioactive fallout in order to build a paradise. The idea was later developed in the writings of Johnny Lovewisdom and then Viktoras Kulvinskas. He went to Ecuador in 1941 where he met John Wierlo (pen-name: Johnny Lovewisdom, aka "the Hermit Saint of the Andes") (July 23, 1919 - October 12, 2000) who had arrived in 1940, where they spoke of plans for a paradisian utopia and a super-race in the Ecuadorean jungle. However Wierlo later claimed he was not planning on creating a super-race, only a Camp of Saints.

On returning to the USA, Siegmeister, now called Robert Raymond, continued to sell his books, before returning to South America. Walter moved to Brazil in 1955 or 1956, in order to buy land and create a super-race. In Brazil, he renewed his interest in aliens, Atlantis, UFOs, tunnels and the hollow earth concept. Siegmeister believed Brazil contained the entrances to the tunnels leading to the hollow earth. In 1964, he found a New York publisher for The Hollow Earth which was based on his book Flying Saucers from the Earth's Interior. The book describes a purported conspiracy to conceal the existence of the hollow earth and its access points at the poles. 
Siegmeister's hollow earth ideas are mentioned in detail in Alan Baker's Invisible Eagle, 2000.

Publications

Many of his book have been republished by Health Research Books.

Apollonius the Nazarene: The Life and Teachings of the Unknown World Teacher of the First Century. Lorida, Fla.: New Age Publications, 1945.
 Escape from Destruction: How to Survive in an Atomic Age. Mokelumne Hill, CA: Health Research, 1956.
 The Serpent Fire: The Awakening of Kundalini (Mokelumne Hill, CA: Health Research, 1959)
 Flying Saucers from the Earth's Interior. Mokelumne Hill, CA: Health Research, 1960.
 The Hollow Earth. New York: Carol Publishing, 1969 [1964].
 Creation of the Superman. Mokelumne Hill, CA: Health Research, 1970.

References

External links
The Memory Palace, history podcast episode: "The World Within the World" 

1903 births
1965 deaths
20th-century American non-fiction writers
American conspiracy theorists
American occult writers
American people of Russian-Jewish descent
American UFO writers
Deaths from pneumonia in Florida
Esotericists
Hollow Earth proponents
Inedia practitioners
Jewish American writers
Orthopaths
People from Manhattan
Pseudoscientific diet advocates
Raw foodists
UFO conspiracy theorists
20th-century American Jews